The 1977 AIAW National Small College Basketball Championship was the third annual tournament hosted by the Association for Intercollegiate Athletics for Women to determine the national champion of collegiate basketball among its small college members in the United States.

The tournament was held at Cal Poly Pomona in Pomona, California between March 22 and March 26, 1977. 

Southeastern Louisiana defeated Phillips (OK) in the championship game, 92–76, to capture the Lions' first AIAW small college national title. 

Sixteen teams participated in a single-elimination tournament that additionally included a third-place final for the two teams that lost in the semifinal games.

Tournament bracket

See also
1977 AIAW National Large College Basketball Championship

References

AIAW women's basketball tournament
AIAW Small College
AIAW National Division I Basketball Championship
1977 in sports in California
Women's sports in California